Jetzt oder nie! ("Now or Never!") was the fourth season of the German reality television show Popstars, broadcast in 2004 on ProSieben. The winning band was Nu Pagadi. The contest was judged by Sandy Mölling, Lukas Hilbert and Uwe Fahrenkrog-Petersen.

Acts

 The contestant became part of the winning band Nu Pagadi.
 The contestant made it to the final six.

External links
 Popstars official website
 Jetzt oder nie! clip, Sixx
 

Jetzt oder Nie!
2004 German television seasons